9 is the ninth studio album by Italian pop-rock singer Eros Ramazzotti, released on 4 June 2003 on the BMG label. Lead single "Un'emozione per sempre" topped the charts in Italy, Switzerland and (in its Spanish language version "Una emoción para siempre") Spain. 9 went to #1 on the Italian Albums chart, where it remained for 14 weeks;  with sales of 760,000, it was the best-selling album of 2003 in Italy.

Track listing

Italian-language edition

Spanish-language edition

Personnel 
Michele Canova – arranger, keyboards, programming, loops, drum programming, mixing
Vinnie Colaiuta – percussion, drums
Max Costa – keyboards, programming
Paolo Costa – bass
Alfredo Golino – drums
Isobel Griffiths – violin
Claudio Guidetti – acoustic guitar, backing vocals, bouzouki, piano, arranger, electric guitar, keyboards, organ, electric piano, producer, fender rhodes, drum programming, mixing, pre-production, mandoline, recording, rickenbacker guitar, 12 string acoustic guitar, baritone guitar
Michael Landau – acoustic guitar, electric guitar, nylon string guitar
Eros Ramazzotti – vocals, backing vocals, guitar, percussion, arranger, electric guitar, producer, drum programming, pre-production, baritone guitar
Celso Valli – piano, arranger, keyboards, organ, electric piano, producer, string arrangements, synthesizer bass, choir arrangement, string director

Charts

Certifications

Notes

Eros Ramazzotti albums
2003 albums
Sony Music Netherlands albums